LAN eXtensions for Instrumentation (LXI) is a standard developed by the LXI Consortium, a consortium that maintains the LXI specification and promotes the LXI Standard. The LXI standard defines the communication protocols for instrumentation and data acquisition systems using Ethernet. Ethernet is a ubiquitous communication standard providing a versatile interface, the LXI standard describes how to use the Ethernet standards for test and measurement applications in a way that promotes simple interoperability between instruments. The LXI Consortium ensures LXI compliant instrumentation developed by various vendors works together with no communication or setup issues. The LXI Consortium ensures that the LXI standard complements other test and measurement control systems, such as GPIB and PXI systems.

Overview 
Proposed in 2005 by Keysight(formerly called Agilent Technologies) and VTI Instruments (formerly called VXI Technology and now part of Ametek), the LXI standard adapts the Ethernet and World Wide Web standards and applies them to test and measurement applications. The standard defines how existing standards should be used in instrumentation applications to provide a consistent feel and ensure compatibility between vendors equipment. The LXI standard does not define a mechanical format, allowing LXI solutions to take any physical form deemed suitable for products in their intended market. LXI products can be modular, rack mounted, bench mounted or take any other physical form.

LXI supports synthetic instruments and peer-to-peer networking, providing a number of unique capabilities to the test engineer.

LXI products may have no front panel or display, or they may include embedded keyboards and displays. Connections to the DUT are permitted to be on the front or the rear to suit market demand, most devices provide front panel connectivity to allow Ethernet and power connections to be provided to the rear panel.

Use of Ethernet allows the simple construction of systems requiring distributed instrumentation systems and control and monitoring systems over large distances, with suitable VPN connections it is possible to connect systems together over inter-continental distances without the use of specialised equipment.

The inclusion of an optional Extended Function based on IEEE 1588 Precision Timing Protocol allows instruments to communicate on a time basis, initiating events at specified times or intervals and time stamping events to indicate when these events occurred in a system.

Interoperability and IVI 
LXI devices can coexist with Ethernet devices that are not themselves LXI compliant. They can also be present in test systems which include products based on the GPIB, VXI, and PXI standards.

The standard mandates that every LXI instrument must have an Interchangeable Virtual Instrument (IVI) driver. The IVI Foundation defines a standard driver application programming interface (API) for programmable instruments. IVI driver formats can be IVI-COM for working with COM-based development environments and IVI-C for working in traditional programming languages or IVI.NET for use in a .NET Framework.

Most LXI instruments can be programmed with methods other than IVI, so it is not mandatory to work with an IVI driver. Developers can use other driver technologies or work directly with SCPI commands.

Standardization 
The LXI Standard has three major elements:
 A standardized LAN interface that provides a framework for web based interfacing and programmatic control. The LAN interface can include wireless connectivity, as well as physically connected interfaces. The interface supports peer-to-peer operation, as well as master/slave operation. Devices can optionally support IPv6.
 An optional trigger facility based on the IEEE 1588 Precision Timing Protocol that enables modules to have a sense of time, which allows modules to time stamp actions and initiate triggered events over the LAN interface.
 An optional physical wired trigger system based on an Multipoint Low-Voltage Differential Signaling (M-LVDS) electrical interface that tightly synchronizes the operation of multiple LXI instruments.

The specification is organized into a set of documents which describe:
 The LXI Device Core Specification which contains the requirements for the LAN interface which all LXI Devices must adhere to
 A set of optional Extended Functions which LXI devices can adhere to. If a device claims conformance it must have been tested under the LXI Consortium Conformance regime. As of March 2016, there are 7 Extended Functions specified
 HiSLIP
 IPv6
 LXI Wired Trigger Bus
 LXI Event Messaging
 LXI Clock Synchronization (based on IEEE1588)
 LXI Time Stamped Data
 LXI Event Log

LXI Consortium 
The LXI Consortium is a US not-for-profit 501(c) organization made up of test and measurement companies. The Consortium's primary purpose is to create, maintain, develop and promote the adoption of the LXI Standard. The LXI Consortium is open to all test and measurement companies, and participation by industry professionals, systems integrators, and government representatives is encouraged.

The first Consortium meeting was held November 17–18, 2004. Membership is divided into four levels: Strategic (Keysight Technologies, Pickering Interfaces and Rohde & Schwarz), Participating, Advisory, and Informational.

Consortium members meet several times a year at PlugFests held around the world where conversations regarding the LXI Standard are discussed face-to-face meetings in working groups. The public is invited to attend tutorials intended for users and manufacturers interested in joining the LXI Consortium. It meetings also provide an opportunity for vendors to certify new products as LXI conformant by having an independent testing authority present at the meeting.

The Consortium's standard development efforts are performed by volunteers working through a number of committees and technical working groups (WG's), Work progression is managed by use of Statement of Work (SoW) documents that set out the reasons and objectives for new work items. New standards are voted on by the members of the consortium once the work is completed.

Specification History 
In September 2005, the LXI Consortium released Version 1.0 of the LXI Standard. Just one year later, Version 1.1 followed with minor corrections and clarifications. In October 2007, the Consortium adopted Version 1.2; its major focus was discovery mechanisms. A discovery mechanism allows the test system to recognize and register a new instrument plugged into the system so the user and other instruments can work with it. Specifically, LXI 1.2 included enhancements to support mDNS discovery of LXI devices. Version 1.3 incorporates the 2008 version of IEEE 1588 for synchronizing time among instruments,

All the revisions of the LXI standard provide backward compatibility and systems can be created which contain any of the versions of the standard.

The latest version of the standard (and older versions) is available on the Consortium Specification page of its website. As of November 2016, the standard is at Revision 1.5.

Version 1.5 of the standard has made VXI-11 based discovery methods optional (as an Extended Function), removed unnecessary recommendations and re-organised Extended Functions into separate documents.

Conformance testing 
The LXI Consortium is unique amongst test and measurements standards in requiring LXI Devices to be tested to the standard. The compliance requirements ensure that at the point of test devices are fully conformant to the standard giving users confidence that there will be no compatibility issues between vendors products

To support this compliance regime an LXI Test Suite is available. After a vendor joins the LXI Consortium they can gain access to the Consortium's Conformance Test Suite software, which they can use as a pre-test before submitting the product to the Consortium for compliance testing. Once a product is ready to submit, a vendor can choose to have its product tested at a PlugFest or an approved test house. A Technical Justification route allows vendors to certify compliance of derivative products by submitting test results to the Consortium to show that the device has been tested on the LXI Test Suite. The consortium provides guidance on when the Technical Justification route can be used and when a new formal test is required.

Conformant instruments 
The number of LXI-compliant instruments has grown dramatically, starting from a handful of products from just two vendors in December 2005. This expansion in instrument availability has encouraged migration to LXI from older instrument platforms. As of January 2017, the Consortium had certified over 3600 instruments as being compliant with the Standard.

References 

 Interchangeable Virtual Instrument (IVI) Foundation website

External links 
 

Networking standards
Electronic test equipment